John Chan Cho Chak, GBS, CBE, LVO, JP (born 8 April 1943) is a Hong Kong civil servant and executive. He currently serves as a non-executive director of Transport International Holdings Limited, The Kowloon Motor Bus Company (1933) Limited, Long Win Bus Company Limited, RoadShow Holdings Limited, Hang Seng Bank Limited, Guangdong Investment Limited and Swire Properties Limited. He was a long-time civil servant and one of the most senior Chinese officials in the Hong Kong Government under British rule.

Education
In 1964, Chan graduated with Honours from the University of Hong Kong in English Literature. He later obtained a Diploma in Management Studies from the University of Hong Kong.

He has been awarded the degrees of Doctor of Business Administration honoris causa by the International Management Centres in 1997 and Doctor of Social Sciences honoris causa by the Hong Kong University of Science and Technology in 2009 and the University of Hong Kong in March 2011.

Career
After Chan's graduation from the University of Hong Kong, Chan joined the Hong Kong Government as an Administrative Officer from 1964 and 1978 and from 1980 to 1993.

Chan has held many key positions in the Hong Kong Government, including: Private Secretary to Governor Murray MacLehose, Deputy Secretary (General Duties), Director of Information Services, Deputy Chief Secretary, Secretary for Trade and Industry and Secretary for Education and Manpower. He also served as a Member of the Executive Council from October 1992 to May 1993. In the private sector, Chan also held a number of important positions including: Executive Director and General Manager of Sun Hung Kai Finance Company Limited (1978-1980), managing director of The Kowloon Motor Bus Company (1933) Limited (1993-2006) and managing director of Transport International Holdings Limited (1997-2008). 

Chan has held a wide range of public and community service positions such as, Non-executive Director of The Hong Kong Exchanges and Clearing Limited (1999-2003), Chairman of the Council of The Hong Kong University of Science and Technology (2002-2008) and Chairman of The Hong Kong Jockey Club (2006-2010). Chan currently serves as Chairman of the Council of the Sir Edward Youde Memorial Fund, Chairman of the Court of The Hong Kong University of Science and Technology and a member of the Exchange Fund Advisory Committee.

Awards
In 1994, Chan was appointed as a Justice of the Peace (JP). In 1999, he received the Gold Bauhinia Star. In 2000, he won the Executive Award in the DHL/SCMP Hong Kong Business Awards and received an Honorary Fellowship from the University of Hong Kong.

References

Living people
Government officials of Hong Kong
Hong Kong chief executives
Alumni of the University of Hong Kong
Members of the Executive Council of Hong Kong
Recipients of the Gold Bauhinia Star
Commanders of the Order of the British Empire
Lieutenants of the Royal Victorian Order
Members of the Selection Committee of Hong Kong
Members of the Election Committee of Hong Kong, 1998–2000
Members of the Election Committee of Hong Kong, 2000–2005
Members of the Election Committee of Hong Kong, 2007–2012
Members of the Election Committee of Hong Kong, 2012–2017
Members of the Election Committee of Hong Kong, 2017–2021
1943 births